Fulford may refer to:

Places
 Fulford, Quebec, Canada
 Fulford, North Yorkshire, England
 Fulford, Somerset, England
 Fulford, Staffordshire, England
 Fulford, Colorado, United States
 Fulford, Florida, United States

Other uses
 Fulford (surname)
 Battle of Fulford

See also
 The F***ing Fulfords, a documentary about Francis Fulford, a landowner in Devon
 Fulford Harbour, British Columbia, Canada
 Fulford Place, a mansion in Ontario, Canada
 Great Fulford, Devon, England
 Little Fulford, Devon, England